Diamond Valley Lake is a man-made off-stream reservoir located near Hemet, California, United States. It is one of the largest reservoirs in Southern California and also one of the newest.

The Metropolitan Water District of Southern California (MWD) began the $1.9 billion construction project in 1995. Filling of the lake, by way of the Colorado River Aqueduct, began in 1999 and was completed in 2003. The lake is currently served by the Inland Feeder.

The lake features three earth fill dams, two located on either side of the valley and one on the north rim. Construction of the dams utilized nearby materials, and was one of the largest earthworks projects in the United States. Excavation of core materials for the dams resulted in many paleontological finds, all of which are displayed at the Western Science Center at the lake's East end. The lake is open to boating and fishing, along with hiking and other recreational activities around the lake.

Geography
The site was chosen because of its location between the cities of San Diego and Los Angeles, and because of the raw materials located on-site for the construction of the three dams.

Construction 
Planning for the lake began in 1987. The main goal was to meet Southern California seasonal, drought and emergency needs. MWD chose the current site because of its geographic location, and began construction planning in 1993. Construction of the lake began in 1995 with construction of the three dams. With over 40 million cubic yards of foundation excavation and 110 million cubic yards of embankment construction, the construction of the dams was the largest earthworks project in the United States. The shovels, loaders and trucks used on the project were the largest available and established a new standard for earth and rock movement. The two rock processing plants established for the project provided combined production exceeding the capability of any single commercial processing operation in California. Construction of the lake was the largest construction project by the MWD since building the Colorado River Aqueduct.

At its peak in 1997 and 1998, the reservoir construction project employed an average of 1,800 people. At times, more than 1,900 people labored in building the reservoir's three dams. From start to finish, about 5,000 people were employed by the construction project.

Dams 

Much of the materials needed were obtained from the project area. Core materials were obtained from the silty and clayey sandy alluvium in the floor of the reservoir and the rock fill came from the bedrock highlands of the reservoir's south rim.

West Dam 
It spans  over a nearly flat alluvial valley floor between bedrock abutment ridges. About 65% of the dam's foundation area is founded on quartzite and phyllite bedrock. Grouting of the west dam took about two years to complete and required  of grout holes.

East Dam 

The embankment required  of crushed rock. An on-site crushing plant crushed and processed over 14 million tons of rock in 20 months to supply the dam's materials.

Because of the amount of material used in the construction of the east dam, some of the biggest trucks in the world were used. Twelve Caterpillar 789 dump trucks were used in construction of the East Dam.

Saddle Dam 
The dam was built to increase the storage capacity of the lake, which would have been limited due to the lower ridge in this area. It is founded completely on phyllite and schist bedrock.

Filling the lake 
Filling of the lake began in 1999 with water from the Colorado River Aqueduct and San Diego Canal. Water first entered the forebay, a   —   — basin that held the water before being pumped through the pumping station. The pumping station, named after one of the founders of the MWD, Hiram W. Wadsworth, features twelve  pumps for moving water from the forebay to the intake-outlet (I/O) tower. In 2001, four of the twelve pumps were converted to hydroelectric turbine generators capable of producing 3 megawatts of power each. If all the pumps were converted, the entire facility could produce up to 40 megawatts of power.

Filling of the lake finished in 2003

In 2009, the lake began being filled with water provided by the Inland Feeder after nearly two years without a source. The water replenished much of what was lost after drought conditions required the MWD to tap into the lake. Water from the Colorado River Aqueduct is not being used due to the threat of the Quagga mussel, an invasive species that has already contaminated other Southern California lakes served by the aqueduct.

Paleontological finds 

During excavation, bones and skeletons were found from extinct mastodons, mammoth, camel, sloth, dire wolf and long-horned bison. 
Paleontologists from the San Bernardino County Museum in Redlands, California uncovered thousands of fossils in the Diamond and Domenigoni valleys that will add immensely to the store of public knowledge about the region.  Collectively, these animal fossils are named the Diamond Valley Lake Local Fauna.

The paleontological finds of mammoth, mastodon, bison, and other Pleistocene Epoch species from Diamond Valley Lake provide a unique snapshot on inland southern California during the Ice Ages, and bridge a massive information gap between fossil deposits at La Brea Tar Pits in Los Angeles, California and Ice Age sites in the Mojave Desert. Unofficially, the Diamond Valley Lake area is often referred to as the "Valley of the Mastodons". Fossils from the Diamond Valley Lake site comprise a classic late Pleistocene assemblage, which includes the following extinct animals:
 Jefferson's ground sloth, Megalonyx jeffersonii
 Harlan's ground sloth, Paramylodon harlani
 Dire wolf, Canis dirus
 Giant short-faced bear, Arctodus simus
 Sabre-toothed cat, Smilodon fatalis
 American lion, Panthera leo atrox
 American mastodon, Mammut americanum
 Columbian mammoth, Mammuthus columbi
 Western horse, Equus occidentalis
 Small horse, Equus conversidens
 Flat-headed peccary, Platygonus compressus
 “Yesterday’s” camel, Camelops hesternus
 Ancient bison, Bison antiquus
 Long-horned bison, Bison latifrons
 Diminutive Pronghorn, Capromeryx minor

Many fossils of rabbits, rodents and pond turtles, as well as coyotes, deer and the Black bear, have been recovered as well. One of the most common animals identified from the Diamond Valley Lake site by San Bernardino County Museum scientists was the extinct American mastodon, Mammut americanum.  In North American paleontology, mastodons are thought to have been solitary forest-dwelling browsers.  The abundance of mastodons in the fossil record from the site suggests that, during the last Ice Age, the Diamond Valley Lake site was more wooded or forested than today.  Fossil remains of ponderosa pine and manzanita recovered from the site lend credence to this interpretation. Radiometric dating of fossil plants from the Diamond Valley Lake site confirms an age range of less than 13,000 years ago to more than 60,000 years ago for these fossils.

Recreation 
Diamond Valley Lake offers fishing and light boating on the lake. A recreation park, aquatic center, visitor center and the Western Science Center along with the lake marina are located on the eastern end of the lake. A viewpoint, offering views of the pumping station and I/O tower, along with most of the lake is located on the western end of the lake. To the south of the lake is the Southwestern Riverside County Multi-Species Reserve, a  preserve between Diamond Valley Lake and Skinner Reservoir. The reserve is home to at least 16 sensitive, endangered or threatened native California bird, animal and plant species.

Stocking of the lake with fish began before the reservoir was filled, with a small rearing pond being placed on the bottom of the valley. The lake has several species of freshwater fish; largemouth bass, smallmouth bass, bluegill, crappie, rainbow trout, striped bass, channel catfish, and shad. It was also discovered that a small population of flathead catfish were accidentally introduced. It is considered one of the best fisheries in California.

Much of the area around the lake remains undeveloped and empty. Original plans included large recreation areas on both the eastern and western end of the lake complete with golf courses, campgrounds, swimming lakes, water parks and other amenities. The MWD still plans on building the additional recreation facilities, but lack of funding and lack of support from developers has prevented them from doing so.

Gallery

See also

 List of dams and reservoirs in California
 List of lakes in California
 List of largest reservoirs of California

References

External links

Reservoirs in Riverside County, California
Reservoirs in Southern California
Reservoirs in California
California State Water Project
Historic American Engineering Record in California